Diósy de Tótdiós (shorter forms: Diósy or Dióssy) was a family of Hungarian nobility. The Diósy name comes from the old name of Tótdiós (Dyos), which means "walnut grove" in Hungarian.

History
In 1336, András gained nobility by serving king Charles I of Hungary bravely, and got the villages of Tótdiós in Nyitra, Garbócbogdány in Kassa, Koksóbaksa in Kassa and Nagyörvistye  in Nagyszombat county, and their surroundings as a gift.

In 1634, the members of the family became barons of the Holy Roman Empire  by serving the king Ferdinand II of Hungary in the Thirty Years' War; and afterwards, they were mentioned as barons even in documents issued by the Kings of Hungary although this title was not recognised in the kingdom at that time.

After the Treaty of Trianon, the family moved to Bonyhád, Hungary.  Every member of the family who fought in the Second World War came back alive and healthy. In 1947, the family lost all of its lands due to the Communist takeover in Hungary. Branches of family are still living in Hungary mostly in Budapest and Slovakia. In addition, the Italian branch of the family lives in Parma while other descendents of the original branch live in the United States today. Part of family lives also in Vojvodina, Serbia,.

Famous members of the family
György Diósy (1354–1395) - Granger of Nyitra
Mihály Diósy (160?-164?) - Second lieutenant
Márton Diósy (1818–1892) - Personal secretary of Lajos Kossuth
Arthur Diosy (1856–1923) - Founder of the Japan-British Society
Lajos Diósy (1867–1922) - Pharmacist
Csaba Diósy (1968–) - Professor of Computer Science
Daniel Dioši (1975-) - Najvyssi krajsky ovocinar

References

Hungarian noble families
European noble families